Patience Oghre Imobhio is a Nigerian film and television director and actress. A graduate of the University of Jos in Theatre Arts, she is best known for directing films such as Dominos, Spider and Household, and TV series such as Dear Mother and Everyday People. In 2015 Pulse magazine named her as one of "9 Nigerian female movie directors you should know" in the Nollywood film industry.

Personal life
She studied Theatre Arts at University of Jos. She is married to Osezua Stephen-Imobhio.

Career
She started off as an actress in 1995 but decided that she's more interested in directing movies. After graduated from University of Jos, she moved to Lagos and join Zeb Ejiro's production. Imohbio is best known for directing films such as Dominos, Spider and Household, and TV series such as Dear Mother and Everyday People.

References

Nigerian women film directors
Living people
University of Jos alumni
Year of birth missing (living people)
Nigerian television directors
Nigerian television actresses
Nigerian film actresses
20th-century Nigerian actresses
21st-century Nigerian actresses
Nigerian film directors